Claudia Gravy (born 12 May 1945) is a Spanish nationalized actress born as Marie-Claude Perin in Boma, Democratic Republic of the Congo when it was the Belgian Congo.

Career 
Claudia has lived in Madrid since 1965, when she made her debut in the cinema with Fernando Fernán Gómez's adaption of Miguel Mihura's work, Ninette y un señor de Murcia. During the following decade she became a familiar face in Spanish cinema, with roles in dozens of films, including both strictly Spanish films and international co-productions, such as Sweetly You'll Die Through Love (La llamada del sexo, 1977) by Tulio Demicheli.

Since the 1980s her credits have become less frequent, but she continues to appear in supporting roles, including Vicente Aranda's Libertarias (1996) and Carlos Naranja Estrella's film, Dreams in the Middle of the World (1999).

In more recent years, she has supplemented her appearances on the big screen with recurring television roles and performances in the theater.

Selected filmography
 Marquis de Sade: Justine (1969)
 Two Undercover Angels (1969)
 The Tigers of Mompracem (1970)
 Matalo! (1970)
 Byleth: The Demon of Incest (1972)
 The Nun and the Devil (1973)
 A forza di sberle (1974)
  La llamada del sexo (1977)
 Yellow Hair and the Fortress of Gold (1984)
 Tuareg: The Desert Warrior'' (1984)

References

External links

Living people
1945 births
Spanish actresses
Democratic Republic of the Congo emigrants to Spain
Naturalised citizens of Spain
Spanish people of Belgian descent